A Dandy in Aspic is a 1968 neo-noir Technicolor and Panavision British spy film, directed by Anthony Mann, based on the 1966 novel of the same name by Derek Marlowe and starring Laurence Harvey, Tom Courtenay, and Mia Farrow. Costumes by Pierre Cardin. It was Mann's final film.

Set against the backdrop of 1960s Cold War Europe, it is the story of a spy known to his superiors in British Intelligence by his code name, "Eberlin" (Laurence Harvey).

Plot
Eberlin (Laurence Harvey), a Cold-War British intelligence operative, has a problem. His superiors have ordered him to find and assassinate a KGB agent named Krasnevin, believed to be responsible for the recent murders of British agents. Summoned to a meeting at a country estate, he is presented with film footage of the suspected Krasnevin. He turns out to be Eberlin's go-between with Russian double agents.

To accomplish his assignment, Eberlin is partnered with a ruthless, cynical, and sociopathic British agent, Gatiss (Tom Courtenay), who openly distrusts and dislikes him. Mia Farrow plays a London-based photographer with whom Eberlin has an affair. Much of the film takes place in West Berlin, where Eberlin, as part of his mission, attempts to cross the Berlin Wall to the East. His attempts are frustrated by his partnership with Gatiss and by the Soviet authorities, who are keen to retain the identity of the assassin.

Cast

Production
Largely filmed on location in London and Berlin, this was Anthony Mann's final film; he died of a heart attack before it was finished. Its direction was completed by Harvey. The film also features Peter Cook, at a time when his TV career was at a peak, in a minor role as the foppish but libidinous British agent Prentiss.

Music

Personnel
 Unidentified orchestra arranged and conducted by Quincy Jones including
 Carol Kaye – electric bass
 Earl Palmer – drums

Reception
Reviews of the film were largely unfavourable. The New York Times described it as "a very wobbly spy movie...slow, blank, decorous and completely devoid of suspense." Variety dismissed the film as a "routine, poorly-titled espionage meller loaded with uninteresting, cardboard characters." Leonard Maltin's Movie Guide rates the film 2 out of 4 stars and describes it as a "wooden spy melodrama in which principals keep switching sides so rapidly it becomes impossible to follow." Among the more positive reviews, Time Out says "the film is strong on Cold War atmospherics and notable for its superior cast."

Home media
A Dandy in Aspic was released to DVD on 1 August 2011 by Sony Pictures Home Entertainment as a DVD-on-demand title available through Amazon. A limited edition blu-ray disc with extensive bonus materials was released in the United Kingdom on 25 March 2019. In 2020, it became available for streaming on The Criterion Channel.

References

External links
 
 
 

1968 films
1960s spy films
British spy films
Cold War spy films
Columbia Pictures films
Films scored by Quincy Jones
Films about the Berlin Wall
Films based on British novels
Films based on thriller novels
Films directed by Anthony Mann
Films set in Berlin
Films set in London
Films set in England
Films set in West Germany
1960s thriller drama films
Films shot in Surrey
Films shot in Berlin
1968 drama films
1960s English-language films
1960s British films